Julimar Silva Oliveira Junior (born 25 January 2001), commonly known as Julimar, is a Brazilian footballer who currently plays as a forward for Athletico Paranaense.

Career statistics

Club

Honours
Athletico Paranaense
Campeonato Paranaense: 2020

References

External links
Athletico Paranaense profile 

2001 births
Living people
Brazilian footballers
Association football forwards
Campeonato Brasileiro Série A players
Campeonato Brasileiro Série B players
Criciúma Esporte Clube players
Club Athletico Paranaense players